Rachel Sánchez Pérez  (born 9 January 1989 in Pinar del Río) is a Cuban volleyball player who competed in the 2008 Summer Olympics.

Career
In 2008, she was a middle-blocker in the Cuban team that finished fourth in the Olympic tournament.

With her Cuban team Ciudad Habana at the Liga Nacional 2011, Sánchez won the MVP award and the championship.

Sánchez moved to the Kazakh League for the 2013/14, playing with Zhetyssu Almaty.

Sánchez won the bronze medal at the 2015 FIVB Club World Championship, playing with the Swiss club Voléro Zürich.

Awards

Individual
 2011 Cuban Liga Nacional "Most Valuable Player"

Club
 2010 Cuban Liga Nacional -  Champion, with Ciudad de La Habana
 2011 Cuban Liga Nacional -  Champion, with Ciudad de La Habana
 2015 FIVB Club World Championship -  Bronze medal, with Voléro Zürich

References

External links
 FIVB profile
 sports-reference.com

1989 births
Living people
Cuban women's volleyball players
Cuban expatriate sportspeople in Switzerland
Expatriate volleyball players in Switzerland
Olympic volleyball players of Cuba
Panathinaikos Women's Volleyball players
Volleyball players at the 2008 Summer Olympics
Central American and Caribbean Games silver medalists for Cuba
Competitors at the 2006 Central American and Caribbean Games
Middle blockers
Expatriate volleyball players in Kazakhstan
Expatriate volleyball players in France
Cuban expatriate sportspeople in France
Central American and Caribbean Games medalists in volleyball
People from Pinar del Río
Cuban expatriate sportspeople in Turkey
Cuban expatriate sportspeople in Greece
Expatriate volleyball players in Turkey
Expatriate volleyball players in Greece